Etienne de Rocher is a Berkeley, California-based singer songwriter who plays a unique style of indie rock. His eponymous album was released in 2006.

As of 2021, de Rocher is part of Athens, Georgia-based Haunted Shed.

Studio albums 
Etienne de Rocher (2006)
Lazybones (unknown)

References

External links

Musicians from Berkeley, California
American male singer-songwriters
Living people
Singer-songwriters from California
Year of birth missing (living people)